Vladlen Igor Konstantin Pavlenkov (4 May 1929 – 31 January 1990) was a  political dissident in the Soviet Union and its sphere of influence, noted for his activities related to Soviet-American postal communications during the Cold War.

Biography
He was a decorated participant in the Soviet war effort during World War II, having been given a medal for his volunteer work as a boy during the war. Vladlen Pavlenkov was a history teacher in Soviet-bloc East Germany during 1953-1956.  Returning to Gorky, he became a principal of high school, and then became a college teacher. He was married to Svelana Pavlenkova (Gerasimova) in 1957. He was arrested in 1969, accused of propaganda and agitation.  He served seven years in a Soviet labor camp, and upon his release was under pressure from KGB to emigrate from USSR.  During his term in prisons, and labor camps, he continued the struggle for human rights, and was eventually put Prison #1, Vladimirskij Tsentral, for the last year and a half of his term.

Pavlenkov emigrated to the United States in 1979 and, speaking little English, found work as a security guard.  In 1982 he founded the non-profit organization Freedom of Communications Committee (FC), whose aim was to promote personal communications between Americans and Soviets through postal mail, telephone and telegraph.

Accomplishments

One of the first serious study of Soviet underground economy, "2x2=4" was written by him in sixties.  All of the copies were searched for, and stolen by KGB.  Whule Vladlen was against the distribution of flyers, once he was given up by the students who did so, he went to KGB building for the interrogations, occupied an office and burned the protocols of the criminal case while inside KGB building.  He became the last one arrested on this charge, ending the prosecution attempts to arrest even more people from among the Gorky's intellectuals.

Through his FC organization, Pavlenkov published Advice to Mailers in both English and Russian, to help ordinary citizens assure that their personal communications were delivered as intended, as well as a periodical newsletter Mail to the USSR.  Pavlenkov and his organization were also instrumental in introducing five amendments to the Universal Postal Union Congress of 1984, and four more amendments in 1989.

After his death on January 30, 1990, his book of autobiographical novels "Izbrannoe" was published by FC-Izdat, Arlington, MA, USA. 

The book consists of three novels.  The first is written before the author emigrates in 1979, the second, in 1984, and the third, in 1989.

Sources
 
 
 
http://nn.mk.ru/articles/2015/06/19/cmutyany-chetvertoy-volny.html

References

Soviet dissidents
1929 births
1990 deaths